The mission of the United States Embassy in Nicaragua is to advance the interests of the United States, and to serve and protect U.S. citizens in Nicaragua.

The embassy is located at Kilometer 5 1/2 (5.5) Carretera Sur, in Managua, Nicaragua.

Enrollment
Travelling in Nicaragua it is advised that all Americans visiting or living in Nicaragua are encouraged to sign up with the U.S. Embassy through the State Department's Smart Traveler Enrollment Program (STEP) website, this ensures that U.S citizens receive updated information on travel and security within Nicaragua.

Nicaragua is the safest listed country in Central America for tourism, though there is a travel warning for U.S citizens traveling to Nicaragua it is recommended that potential tourists and Investors check the State Department's Smart Traveler website.

U.S Embassy Information
The main U.S Embassy is located in Managua,  address: Kilometer 5 1/2 (5.5) Carretera Sur, in Managua, Nicaragua. 
This is the location for the embassy for U.S Citizens wishing to visit or to make directions to the U.S Embassy facility.

The U.S Embassy is available for the following facilities:
 Arrest of a U.S. Citizen
 Death of a U.S. Citizen
 Victims of Crime
 Emergency Financial Assistance
 Safety & Security Messages
 Local Resources for U.S. Citizens
 Citizenship Services
 Passports
 Internal Revenue Service
 Selective Service Registration
 Social Security
 Veterans Affairs
 Voting
 Adoption
 Birth
 International Parental Child Abduction

Ambassador to Nicaragua

, Ambassador of the United States to Nicaragua is Kevin K. Sullivan, who was appointed by President Donald Trump and confirmed by the Senate on October 11, 2018.

References

External links 
 americanembassynicaragua.com

Managua
United States
Nicaragua–United States relations